Mynor Javier Escoe Miller (born 6 April 1991) is a Costa Rican footballer for club Limón.

External links

1991 births
Living people
Costa Rican men's footballers
Costa Rican expatriate footballers
Costa Rica under-20 international footballers
FC Lorient players
Stabæk Fotball players
R. Charleroi S.C. players
Tampico Madero F.C. footballers
Universidad Técnica de Cajamarca footballers
C.S. Herediano footballers
Deportivo Saprissa players
A.C.C.D. Mineros de Guayana players
Ascenso MX players
Liga FPD players
Eliteserien players
Belgian Pro League players
Peruvian Primera División players
Venezuelan Primera División players
Championnat National 2 players
Association football wingers
Expatriate footballers in France
Expatriate footballers in Belgium
Expatriate footballers in Norway
Expatriate footballers in Mexico
Expatriate footballers in Peru
Expatriate footballers in Venezuela
Costa Rican expatriate sportspeople in France
Costa Rican expatriate sportspeople in Belgium
Costa Rican expatriate sportspeople in Norway
Costa Rican expatriate sportspeople in Mexico
Footballers from San José, Costa Rica